David Roytman Luxury Judaica is a manufacturing company established in 2015, specializing in luxury Judaica.

Production specializes Judaica such as kippahs, mezuzah cases, ketubah cases, and bags for a tallit and tefillin set. Also such fashion accessories as cufflinks, belts and pendants engraved with Jewish symbols. The company also designs individual monograms.

While the company is incorporated in New York, design and manufacturing take place in Odesa, Ukraine. The company has outlet stores in major cities around the world, like Jerusalem, London, Moscow, New York, Odesa, Paris, St. Petersburg, Vienna and Vilnius.

Kippahs and other products are made from such exotic materials as crocodile leather, ostrich leather, python skin and stingray leather. Laser engraving is used to apply the company logo, which is based on the initials of its Odesa-born Israeli owner, David Roytman. A David Roytman Luxury Judaica kippah can cost over $1,000.

Famous people owning David Roytman Luxury Judaica kippas are United States President Donald Trump, Israeli Prime Minister Benjamin Netanyahu and Ukrainian Prime Minister Vladimir Groisman.

See also 
 Jewish ceremonial art

References

External links 
 
 Interview, The London Weekly
 Interview, Lechaim Magazine 

Manufacturing companies established in 2015
Design companies established in 2015
Manufacturing companies based in New York City
Design companies of the United States
Manufacturing companies based in Odesa
Design companies of Ukraine